The Kolomna Speed Skating Center (Russian: Коломенский центр конькобежного спорта) is a 6,150-seat indoor speed skating oval in Kolomna, Russia, also known as the Kometa Ice Rink. It opened in May 2006.

It cost €150 million to build the venue. The venue hosted the 2008 European Speed Skating Championships in January 2008 as well as World Cup events in 2007, 2009 and 2013.

It hosted the 2016 World Single Distance Speed Skating Championships on 11–14 February 2016.

Track records

Men

Women

Source: www.speedskatingnews.info

References

External links

 
 Kolomna Speed Skating Center on www.speedskatingnews.info

Indoor arenas in Russia
Indoor speed skating venues
Sport in Kolomna
Speed skating venues in Russia